Edward Courtney may refer to:

Sir Edward Courtney, character in the film, The Courtneys of Curzon Street
Edward Courtney (classicist) (1932–2019), a Northern Irish classical scholar
Edward Courtney (Jesuit), see Oath of Allegiance of James I of England
Tedda Courtney (Joseph Edward Courtney, 1883–1957), Australian rugby league footballer and coach
Ed Courtney Jr. (1905–1986), his son, Australian rugby league footballer

See also
Edward Courtenay (disambiguation)